The 2000 WGC-NEC Invitational was a golf tournament from August 24–27, 2000 over the South Course at Firestone Country Club in Akron, Ohio. It was the second WGC-NEC Invitational tournament, and the second of four World Golf Championships events in 2000.

World number 1 Tiger Woods won the tournament to retain the WGC-NEC Invitational and claim his third World Golf Championships title. He won by an eleven-stroke margin, and set the tournament record for aggregate score (259) and score to-par (−21), having tied José María Olazábal's course record of 61 in the second round. His final approach to the 18th green was famously in the dark, hitting his iron shot to within a couple of feet of the hole. He would make birdie to seal the victory.

Field
1. 2000 United States and International Presidents Cup teams
United States: Paul Azinger, Notah Begay III, Stewart Cink, Jim Furyk (2), Tom Lehman (2), Davis Love III (2), Phil Mickelson (2), Loren Roberts, Hal Sutton (2), Kirk Triplett, Tiger Woods (2)
David Duval (2) did not play due to injury.
International: Robert Allenby, Stuart Appleby, Michael Campbell, Ernie Els, Carlos Franco, Retief Goosen, Shigeki Maruyama, Greg Norman, Nick Price, Mike Weir
Steve Elkington and Vijay Singh did not play due to injury.

2. 1999 United States Ryder Cup team
Justin Leonard, Jeff Maggert, Mark O'Meara, Steve Pate
Payne Stewart died in a plane crash in November 1999.

3. The leading 12 European players from the European Tour Order of Merit after the Victor Chandler British Masters
Thomas Bjørn, Darren Clarke, Andrew Coltart, Pádraig Harrington, Miguel Ángel Jiménez, Paul McGinley, Colin Montgomerie, José María Olazábal, Gary Orr, Phillip Price, Lee Westwood, Ian Woosnam

Round summaries

First round

Second round

Third round

Final round

External links
Full results

WGC Invitational
WGC-NEC Invitational
WGC-NEC Invitational
WGC-NEC Invitational